KSWO may refer to:

 KSWO-TV, a television station (channel 11) licensed to Lawton, Oklahoma, United States
 Stillwater Regional Airport (ICAO code KSWO)